Cavolinia may refer to:
 Cavolinia (gastropod) Abildgaard, 1791, a genus of gastropods in the family Cavoliniidae
 Cavolinia Bruguière, 1791, a genus of gastropods in the family Facelinidae, synonym of Cratena
 Cavolinia, a genus of cnidarians in the family Sphenophidae, synonym of Palythoa